Kolah Kabud-e Olya (also Romanized as Kolāh Kabūd-e ‘Olyā; also known as Kalā Kabūd-e Bālā) is a village in Miyan Darband Rural District, in the Central District of Kermanshah County, Kermanshah Province, Iran. At the 2006 census, its population was 73, in 18 families.

References 

Populated places in Kermanshah County